Shaun Palmer's Pro Snowboarder is a 2001 snowboarding video game with a similar feel to the Tony Hawk's Pro Skater series. It was developed by Dear Soft and published by Activision under the Activision O2 label. The game features ten famous snowboarders, including Shaun Palmer, Ross Powers and Shaun White. A demo version of the game is available in the options menu of the PlayStation 2 version of Tony Hawk's Pro Skater 3. A sequel was in development by Treyarch, but was later canceled.

Reception

The Game Boy Advance and PlayStation 2 versions received "mixed" reviews according to video game review aggregator Metacritic.

References

External links
 
 
 

2001 video games
Game Boy Advance games
Game Boy Color games
Cancelled Dreamcast games
Cancelled Xbox games
Multiplayer and single-player video games
PlayStation 2 games
Snowboarding video games
Video games based on real people
Video games developed in Japan